Louis Franklin Olinde (born March 19, 1998 in Hamburg) is a German professional basketball player for Alba Berlin of the Basketball Bundesliga. Standing at 205 cm (6 ft 9 in), Olinde plays as guard or forward.

His father Wilbert Olinde won the 1975 NCAA Men's Division I Basketball Tournament with UCLA and took his game to Germany following his collegiate career.

Career 
Olinde's career began in the youth ranks of BC Hamburg. He joined the Piraten Hamburg organization in 2011 to compete in the JBBL, Germany's under 16 division. In 2014, he made the Piraten under 19 side which plays in the NBBL, Germany's highest youth league.

Olinde earned a spot on the roster of SC Rist Wedel, a member of Germany's third-tier men's league ProB, for the 2014-15 season, but had to wait until the following campaign to see playing time. In accordance with an agreement of cooperation between SC Rist Wedel and Pro A side Hamburg Towers, Olinde was permitted to play for both clubs in the 2015-16 season, but primarily appeared in Pro B games for SC Rist. Still eligible to compete at the youth level that year, he also turned out for the Piraten Hamburg under 19 squad in 2015-16, and was selected for the 2016 NBBL All-Star Game.

In June 2016, he attended the NBA Top 100 camp in Charlottesville, Virginia. On June 23, 2016, Olinde signed a four-year deal with the Brose Bamberg of the German top-flight Basketball-Bundesliga. He logged his first Bundesliga minutes in the season opener against Frankfurt on September 23, 2016. After having averaged 23 minutes, 6.8 points and 5.3 rebounds per game in the 2019-20 Bundesliga season, he signed a three-year deal with fellow Bundesliga side Alba Berlin in July 2020.

International career 
In August 2014, Olinde made the roster of Germany's U16 Men's National Team for the European Championships in Latvia. In nine appearances, he averaged 3.9 points and 4.7 rebounds during the tournament.

In December 2015, he was named to the roster of Germany's U18 Men's National Team and helped the team win the 2016 Albert-Schweitzer-Tournament. He helped the German U18 squad to a fourth-place finish at the European Championship in December 2016, averaging 5.0 points and 5.2 rebounds a contest. Seeing action in all seven games during the 2017 FIBA Under-19 Basketball World Cup, Olinde posted 9.4 points and 5.3 rebounds a game en route to a fifth-place finish. He helped Germany win bronze at the 2018 FIBA Europe Under-20 Championship, averaging 7.3 points and 7.1 rebounds throughout the tournament.

References

External links 
Louis Olinde – Draft profile

1998 births
Living people
Alba Berlin players
Baunach Young Pikes players
Brose Bamberg players
German men's basketball players
German people of African-American descent
Hamburg Towers players
Power forwards (basketball)
Small forwards
Sportspeople from Hamburg